Umu Obiligbo  are Nigeria duo singer and Highlife musicians named Chukwuebuka Akunwafor Obiligbo  and Ifeanyichukwu Okpuozor Obiligbo . They are known for their highlife songs, performances and their Igbo approach to music. They won “Best African Group award” at the “African Muzik Magazine Awards” (AFRIMMA) 2020.

Early life 
Umu Obiligbo are natives of Nteje in Oyi Local Government Area of Anambra State, Nigeria. They were born and brought up in Nkpor, a town close to Onitsha where they attended their primary and secondary school.

Career 
Umu Obiligbo released their first album “Ife Di Mma” on 11 February 2014, and released another EP “Udo Ga Di” on 30 December of same year.
They released another EP titled “Awele” in December 2018 which featured Flavour in the hit track ‘Awele’ with videos shot afterwards.
On April 9 2019, the duo released a hit track titled ‘Culture’ featuring Flavour and Phyno.
On 16 November 2020 they released the album “Signature (Ife Chukwu Kwulu).” 
They were featured on a track in Basketmouth's Yabasi soundtrack album and also featured on two tracks for Rattlesnake soundtrack with Larry Gaaga.

Discography 

Albums/EPs
 Ife Di Mma (2014)
 Udo Ga Di (2014)
 Awele (2018)
 Signature (Ife Chukwu Kwulu) (2020)

Awards

See also 
Flavour
The Caveman (band)
Phyno

References 

Nigerian musical duos
Musicians from Anambra State
21st-century Nigerian musicians
Nigerian highlife musicians